Jon Andoni Goikoetxea Lasa (born 21 October 1965), often known as Goiko, is a Spanish retired footballer.

An attacking player of wide range, he operated in various positions on the right side of the pitch (right-back, midfielder or forward), and was best known for his Barcelona spell, during the club's Dream Team years.

Having amassed La Liga totals of 386 matches and 37 goals in 13 seasons, Goikoetxea appeared for Spain at the 1994 World Cup.

Club career
Goikoetxea was born in Pamplona and was a product of hometown club CA Osasuna's youth ranks. He first appeared in La Liga two days shy of his 20th birthday, in a 2–0 away loss against RC Celta de Vigo. First choice from early on, he scored a career-best 11 goals in the 1987–88 season as the Navarrese finished fifth.

Subsequently, Goiko signed for league giants FC Barcelona, but was immediately loaned for two years to Osasuna's neighbours Real Sociedad in a deal also involving Txiki Begiristain and José Mari Bakero who went to Barcelona from San Sebastián. He only missed two league games over two seasons, achieving another fifth place in his second.

In 1990–91, Goikoetxea arrived at Camp Nou, joining several other Basque players including Begiristain, Andoni Zubizarreta, Julio Salinas and Bakero; these would help form the backbone of the legendary Dream Team, winning four league titles in a row and adding the club's first European Cup (where he appeared in the second half of the 1–0 win over U.C. Sampdoria). He also scored the winning goal in the subsequent edition of the UEFA Super Cup, won at the expense of SV Werder Bremen.

Goikoetxea played 37 matches in his first season with Barça, being voted the Spanish Footballer of the Year by Don Balón magazine. In the summer of 1994 he joined another Basque side, Athletic Bilbao, making 112 competitive appearances during his spell.

Goikoetxea retired in 1999 after a brief spell with Japan's Yokohama Marinos – where he again teamed up with Salinas– and a return to Osasuna, now in the second division. Six years later he started his coaching career, always under former Osasuna and Athletic teammate José Ángel Ziganda; the pair worked at newly promoted Xerez CD during the 2009–10 campaign, leaving in early 2010 due to poor results.

International career
Goikoetxea played 36 times for the Spain national team in six years, representing the country at the 1994 FIFA World Cup. His debut came on 12 September 1990, in a 3–0 friendly victory over Brazil.

During the 1994 competition in the United States, Goikoetxea appeared in all the matches, scoring twice in two draws against South Korea (2–2) and Germany (1–1), his misplaced crossing attempt catching goalkeeper Bodo Illgner off-guard in the latter game.

Career statistics

Club

International

Scores and results list Spain's goal tally first, score column indicates score after each Goikoetxea goal.

Honours
Barcelona
La Liga: 1990–91, 1991–92, 1992–93, 1993–94
Supercopa de España: 1991, 1992
European Cup: 1991–92
UEFA Super Cup: 1992

Spain U20
FIFA U-20 World Cup runner-up: 1985

References

External links

1965 births
Living people
Spanish footballers
Footballers from Pamplona
Association football midfielders
Association football forwards
Association football utility players
La Liga players
Segunda División players
Segunda División B players
CA Osasuna B players
CA Osasuna players
Real Sociedad footballers
FC Barcelona players
Athletic Bilbao footballers
J1 League players
Yokohama F. Marinos players
Spain youth international footballers
Spain under-21 international footballers
Spain under-23 international footballers
Spain international footballers
1994 FIFA World Cup players
Basque Country international footballers
Spanish expatriate footballers
Expatriate footballers in Japan
Spanish expatriate sportspeople in Japan